The 1871 Halifax by-election was fought on 13 March 1871.  The by-election was caused by the incumbent Liberal MP, James Stansfeld, becoming President of the Poor Law Board.  It was retained by James Stansfeld who was unopposed.

References

1871 elections in the United Kingdom
1871 in England
19th century in Yorkshire
March 1817 events
Elections in Calderdale
Halifax, West Yorkshire
By-elections to the Parliament of the United Kingdom in West Yorkshire constituencies
Unopposed ministerial by-elections to the Parliament of the United Kingdom